At the 1996 Summer Olympics in Atlanta, 44 events in athletics were contested. There were a total number of 2053 participating athletes from 191 countries.

A total of two world records and 14 Olympic records were set during the competition.

Medal winners

Men

* Athletes who participated in the heats only and received medals.

Women

* Athletes who participated in the heats only and received medals.

Olympic and world records broken

Men 
Note: Any world record is also an Olympic record

Women

Medal table

Participating nations
A total of 190 nations participated in the different Athletics events at the 1996 Summer Olympics.

References

External links
 Official Report
 GBR Athletics
 Sports123 
 Athletics Australia

 
1996 Summer Olympics events
1996
Olympics
International track and field competitions hosted by the United States